Großer Segeberger See is a lake in Kreis Segeberg, Schleswig-Holstein, Germany.

External links 
 

Lakes of Schleswig-Holstein
LGrosserSegebergerSee